Joel Thompson (October 3, 1760February 8, 1843) was an American politician and attorney who served as a United States Representative from New York.

Early life and education 
Born in Stanford in the Province of New York, he attended the common schools in Smyrna. He studied law, was admitted to the bar and practiced in Duanesburg and Sherburne.

Career 
He served in the Continental Army in 1779 and 1780 and was a member of the New York State Assembly in 1798, 1803, and 1804, serving one term as member from Albany County and two terms as a member from Chenango County, New York. He was assistant justice of the court of common pleas of Chenango County from July 1799 to June 1807, when he became judge of Chenango County, serving until March 16, 1814.

Thompson was elected as a Federalist to the 13th United States Congress, holding office from March 4, 1813 to March 3, 1815. He resumed the practice of law in Sherburne, New York.

Death 
In 1843, Thompson died in Brooklyn. He was interred in Green-Wood Cemetery.

References

External links 

1760 births
1843 deaths
People from Stanford, New York
People from Albany County, New York
People from Sherburne, New York
New York (state) state court judges
Burials at Green-Wood Cemetery
Members of the New York State Assembly
Federalist Party members of the United States House of Representatives from New York (state)